The 3rd Space Operations Squadron (3 SOPS) is a United States Space Force unit responsible for conducting on-orbit operations. It is located at Schriever Space Force Base, Colorado.

Mission
The mission of 3 SOPS was to ensure reliable space-borne communications to the President, the Secretary of Defense and U.S. and Allied Forces. The mission is accomplished by conducting launch and on-orbit operations for the Defense Satellite Communications System Phase III satellites and Wideband Global Satellite. These satellites provide secure high-rate data communications links to the President, the Secretary of Defense, theater commanders, and strategic and tactical forces worldwide.

History

World War II 

The squadron was first activated at Maxwell Field, Alabama as the 3rd Photographic Squadron under the 1st Photographic Group in May 1941. It performed aerial mapping primarily over the southeastern United States prior to the Pearl Harbor Attack using Bell P-39 Airacobra sub-variants (F-2) which were equipped for the ground-attack and reconnaissance roles. After the United States entry into World War II, the unit flew aerial mapping missions over the Caribbean and northern South America, mapping various islands for locations of airfields to support the South Atlantic Transport route and Antilles Air Command antisubmarine mission. In addition, it flew aerial mapping missions over Western Canada and the Alaska Territory, mapping uncharted territory to support the building of the Alaska Highway.

The squadron deployed to the China-Burma-India theater in December 1943, performing unarmed long-range mapping of remote areas of the Theater over combat areas in support of ground forces and strategic target identification over Indochina and Malay Peninsula for follow-up raids by XX Bomber Command operating from India.

The 3d returned to the United States in early 1944 and re-equipped with very long range Boeing B-29 Superfortresses converted to F-13A reconnaissance configuration. While the squadron was training, XXI Bomber Command identified the need to include a flight of ferret aircraft in the squadron.  These aircraft would assist the strategic bombing campaign against Japan by identifying electronic threats and assisting with jamming efforts.  No B-29 ferrets had been developed, so the first of these aircraft was a B-24J, which deployed to the Pacific in February 1945.

On 1 November 1944, a 3rd Photographic Reconnaissance Squadron  F-13 became the first American aircraft over Tokyo since the famed Doolittle Raid in 1942.  The entire 3d deployed to the Central Pacific Area in January 1945 and was attached to XXI Bomber Command. An additional five B-24M aircraft were modified at Wright Field, Ohio to fully equip the squadron's ferret flight, but one was diverted to March Field, California to establish a ferret training flight.  Upon arrival at Guam, these planes were modified for night operations.  The Guam Air Depot also modified three of these aircraft to include a capability to intercept Japanese voice communications to better understand Japanese fighter direction techniques.  Two radio intercept positions were installed, staffed by Japanese linguist volunteers from the 8th Radio Squadron, Mobile.

The squadron supported the strategic air offensive over the Japanese Home Islands.  By the end of the war, the 3rd PRS had flown 460 combat missions mainly over Japan. y the end of the war, the 3d had flown 460 combat missions mainly over Japan. Shortly after the end of the war, the growing importance of its radio countermeasures mission in comparison to its photographic mission was recognized by its redesignation as the 3rd Reconnaissance Squadron, Very Long Range (Photographic-RCM). It remained in the Western Pacific performing reconnaissance mapping flights over Japan, Korea, and China.

The squadron's F-13s returned to the United States in early 1946 for storage or reassignment.  It was inactivated in early 1947.

From the 1980s 
In 1985, the initial cadre of Air Force NATO III and DSCS II satellite operators received training at Sunnyvale Air Force Station, California. These personnel relocated to Falcon Air Force Base in 1987 and became Operating Location-AB, Consolidated Space Test Center. These men and women became the nucleus of what would eventually become the 3rd Space Operations Squadron (SOPS). On 2 August 1988, OL-AB began 24-hour operations at Falcon AFS. By May 1989, OL-AB was conducting station-keeping maneuvers on NATO III and DSCS II satellites. On 2 February 1990, OL-AB was discontinued and its personnel, equipment and mission transferred to the newly activated 3rd Satellite Control Squadron (SCS).

In November 1990, the 3d SCS was directed to relocate a DSCS II satellite from over the Pacific to a position over the Indian Ocean to support Operation Desert Shield. The series of relocation maneuvers were completed in December 1990 and the satellite was then configured for operational use. Crews saved a failing FLTSATCOM spacecraft just as Operation Desert Storm commenced, ensuring the U.S. Navy's two carrier groups had command and control of their aircraft.

On 11 July 1991, in a formal operations turnover ceremony, the squadron accepted complete operational mission transfer of all assigned satellite programs. This transfer officially established operational control of the assigned DOD communications satellites to Air Force Space Command.

On 30 January 1992, as part of a reorganization at Falcon AFB, the 3d SCS was redesignated the 3d SOPS.

On 25 March 1993, the first UHF F/O satellite was launched. Unfortunately due to an Atlas II rocket booster malfunction, the satellite was placed in the wrong orbit. Over the next several weeks, squadron personnel planned and executed a series of 25 maneuvers to move the satellite to a super-synchronous orbit. The commander of Air Force Space Command recognized 3rd SOPS for their efforts.

In June 1996, as part of an Air Force and Navy agreement, operations of the FLTSAT constellation were turned over to the Naval Satellite Operations Center at Point Mugu, California. In December 1996, 3rd SOPS transferred control of the Milstar constellation to the 4th SOPS. On 18 December 1996, the 3d SOPS gained control of five operating locations in Nebraska, Virginia, Guam, Italy, and Hawaii. The OLs were responsible for running the Air Force's Satellite Management Centers, which monitored and controlled user access to UHF communications satellites. As part of the same agreement that transferred FLTSAT, the SMC's mission was also transferred to the Navy.

On 2 July 1999, as part of the same agreement that transferred FLTSAT to the Navy, operational control of UHF F/O Flights 2–9 transferred to NAVSOC. On 10 February 2000, after several months of on-orbit checkout, 3rd SOPS conducted its last UHF F/O sortie on Flight 10.

As part of the Congressionally mandated Base Realignment and Closure decision to close Onizuka Air Force Station, the 3d SOPS assumed the DSCS III launch mission from 5th SOPS.

Lineage
3rd Reconnaissance Squadron
 Constituted as the 3rd Photographic Squadron on 15 May 1941
 Activated on 10 June 1941
 Redesignated as 3rd Mapping Squadron on 13 January 1942
 Redesignated as 3rd Photographic Mapping Squadron on 9 June 1942
 Redesignated as 3rd Photographic Reconnaissance Squadron, Very Heavy on 19 May 1944
 Redesignated as 3rd Reconnaissance Squadron, Very Long Range (Photographic-RCM) on 19 September 1945
 Redesignated as 3rd Reconnaissance Squadron, Very Long Range, Photographic on 16 January 1946
 Inactivated on 15 March 1947
 Consolidated with the 3rd Space Operations Squadron on 13 October 1994 as the 3rd Space Operations Squadron

3rd Space Operations Squadron
 Redesignated as 3rd Satellite Control Squadron and activated on 9 January 1990
 Redesignated as 3rd Space Operations Squadron on 30 January 1992
 Consolidated with the 3rd Reconnaissance Squadron on 13 October 1994
 Consolidated with the 4th Space Operations Squadron on 13 June 2017

Assignments
 1st Photographic (later Mapping; Photographic Charting) Group, 10 June 1941
 11th Photographic Group, 1 December 1943
 311th Photographic (later Reconnaissance) Wing, 5 October 1944 (attached to Twentieth Air Force, 1 November 1944 – 13 December 1944, XXI Bomber Command, 14 December 1944 – 15 July 1945, Twentieth Air Force, 16 July 1945 – 2 February 1947)
 Twentieth Air Force, 3 February – 15 March 1947
 2d Space Wing, 9 January 1990
 50th Operations Group, 1 January 1992 – 13 June 2017

Stations
 Maxwell Field, Alabama, 10 June 1941
 MacDill Field, Florida, 22 December 1941
 Smoky Hill Army Air Field, Kansas, 16 April – 3 August 1944
 Isley Field, Saipan, Mariana Islands, 18 September 1944
 Harmon Field, Guam, Mariana Islands, 11 January 1945 – 15 March 1947
 Falcon Air Force Base (later Schriever Air Force Base), Colorado, 9 January 1990 – 13 June 2017

Aircraft/Satellites operated

 P-39/F-2 Airacobra, 1942
 B-25/F-10 Mitchell, 1942–1944
 B-24/F-7 Liberator, 1943–1945
 B-17/F9 Flying Fortress, 1944; 1946–1947
 B-29/F-13A Superfortress, 1944–1947

Wideband Global Satellite (2007–2017)
UHF Follow-On (1990–2004)
DSCS III(1990–2017)
Skynet IV/NATO IV (1990–2004)
FLTSATCOM (1990–2017)
DSCS II (1990–2017)

Awards and campaigns

 Air Force Outstanding Unit Award

 1 September 1990 – 31 August 1991
 1 October 2000 – 1 October 2001

 1 October 2001 – 1 October 2002
 2 October 2002 – 2 October 2003

 American Theater of World War II
 
 China Burma India Theater Pacific Theater
 Campaigns

 Western Pacific

 Air Offensive, Japan

List of commanders

 Capt H. C. Houston, 10 Jun 1941
 1 Lt R. H. Payne, 16 April 1942
 Maj Carl C. Hughes, 7 May 1942
 Capt Robert S. Dodson, 10 August 1942
 Lt Col Patrick B. McCarthy, 23 July 1943
 Maj Robert C. Hutton, June 1945 – unknown
 Lt Col Victor P. Budura Jr., 2 February 1990
 Lt Col Bruce M. Roang, 21 August 1990
 Lt Col Stephen R. Gast, 27 July 1992
 Lt Col Mark H. Owen, 17 February 1995
 Lt Col Susan P. Asher, 24 June 1996
 Lt Col Thomas W. Billick, 29 September 1998
 Lt Col Michael R. Dickey, 10 July 2000
 Lt Col David M. Tobin, 2 July 2002
 Lt Col Anthony K. Hinson, 2 July 2003
 Lt Col William Bishop Jr., 20 June 2005
 Lt Col P. Brent McArthur, 28 June 2007
 Lt Col Jean Eisenhut, 23 June 2009
 Lt Col Kevin Mortensen, 3 August 2011 – February 2012
 Lt Col Chadwick Igl, March 2012 – June 2014
 Lt Col Michael Todd, 24 June 2014 – ~20 June 2016
 Lt Col Joshua Brooks, 20 June 2016 – 13 June 2017
 Lt Col Bryony L. Slaughter, ~19 June 2020 – 14 June 2022
 Lt Col Joshua M. Faustman, 14 June 2022 – present

References

Notes

Bibliography

  (web access limited to members)

Further reading

External links
Schriever AFB Website

Squadrons of the United States Space Force
Military units and formations established in 1990
Military units and formations in Colorado